Five Young American Poets was a three volume series of poetry anthologies released from 1940 to 1944. The series was published by New Directions Publishers (Norfolk, Connecticut; James Laughlin, publisher). 

Volume I - 1940  includes selected poetry by:
 W. R. Moses
 Randall Jarrell
 George Marion O'Donnell
 John Berryman
 Mary Barnard
Reviews.

Volume II - 1941 includes selected poetry by:
 Clark Mills
 Karl Shapiro
 David Schubert
 Jeanne McGahey
 Paul Goodman

Volume III - 1944 includes selected poetry by:
 Eve Merriam
 John Frederick Nims
 Jean Garrigue
 Tennessee Williams
 Alejandro Carrión

References

1940 poetry books
1941 poetry books
1944 poetry books
1940 anthologies
1941 anthologies
1944 anthologies
Series of books
American poetry anthologies
New Directions Publishing books